In enzymology, a L-gulonate 3-dehydrogenase is an enzyme that catalyzes the chemical reaction

L-gulonate + NAD+  3-dehydro-L-gulonate + NADH + H+

Thus, the two substrates of this enzyme are L-gulonate and NAD+, whereas its 3 products are 3-dehydro-L-gulonate, NADH, and H+.

This enzyme belongs to the family of oxidoreductases, specifically those acting on the CH-OH group of donor with NAD+ or NADP+ as acceptor. The systematic name of this enzyme class is L-gulonate:NAD+ 3-oxidoreductase. Other names in common use include L-3-aldonate dehydrogenase, L-3-aldonic dehydrogenase, L-gulonic acid dehydrogenase, L-beta-hydroxyacid dehydrogenase, L-beta-hydroxy-acid-NAD+-oxidoreductase, and L-3-hydroxyacid dehydrogenase. This enzyme participates in pentose and glucuronate interconversions.

Structural studies

As of late 2007, only one structure has been solved for this class of enzymes, with the PDB accession code .

References

 
 

EC 1.1.1
NADH-dependent enzymes
Enzymes of known structure